Chiara Zanni (born July 19, 1978) is a Canadian actress and comedian. She is known for her roles as Amy Ryan on The N series About a Girl and Maggie Buckman on the CBC series Edgemont.

She is also known for her voice-work as Hahli in Bionicle: Mask of Light, the titular character in Hamtaro, Jubilee in X-Men: Evolution, Eva "Molly" Wei in Ōban Star-Racers, Piper in Storm Hawks, Stellaluna in the film adaptation of Stellaluna, and Kani Maki in Sushi Pack.

Life and career
Zanni was born in Vancouver, British Columbia, to an Italian father and an English mother. She started her career at the age of eight when she was cast as the "Pokey Little Puppy" in the animated series Little Golden Bookland. She has appeared in the feature films X-Men, 40 Days and 40 Nights, Come l'America, In the Land of Women and Good Luck Chuck.

Her television credits include Supernatural, Stargate Atlantis, Edgemont, Trophy Wife, Bye Bye Birdie, 1st to Die and Post Mortem. She has also provided voice-work to projects such as Zeke's Pad, Hamtaro, Trollz, My Little Pony, Polly Pockets, Barbie: Fairytopia, X-Men: Evolution, Sabrina: The Animated Series, Bionicle: Mask of Light, Inuyasha, Storm Hawks, and Ōban Star-Racers.

In 2013, she made her Los Angeles voice acting debut with Henry Hugglemonster.

She voiced Daring Do in My Little Pony: Friendship is Magic, and she has appeared in MLP conventions in Vancouver and Richmond.

Personal life
Zanni is married and is a Christian.

Filmography

Live-action

Film

Television

Voice acting

Anime

Animation

Film

Video games

References

External links

1978 births
Actresses from Vancouver
Canadian child actresses
Canadian film actresses
Canadian people of English descent
Canadian people of Italian descent
Canadian television actresses
Canadian voice actresses
Canadian women comedians
Living people
Canadian impressionists (entertainers)
Comedians from Vancouver
Canadian Christians